The Auburn Tigers football statistical leaders are individual statistical leaders of the Auburn Tigers football program in various categories, including passing, rushing, receiving, total offense, defensive stats, and kicking. Within those areas, the lists identify single-game, Single season and career leaders. The Tigers represent Auburn University in the NCAA's Southeastern Conference.

Although Auburn began competing in intercollegiate football in 1892, the school's official record book considers the "modern era" to have begun in 1947. Records from before this year are often incomplete and inconsistent, and they are generally not included in these lists.

These lists are dominated by more recent players for several reasons:
 In 1947, seasons increased from 10 games to 11 games in length. In 2006, seasons increased from 11 games to 12 games in length.
 The NCAA didn't allow freshmen to play varsity football until 1972 (with the exception of the World War II years), allowing players to have four-year careers.
 Bowl games only began counting toward Single season and career statistics in 2002. The Tigers have played in 14 bowl games since this decision.
 The Tigers have had two seasons, 2010 and 2013, in which the Tigers run a high-octane offense that racked up 6,989 and 7,018 offensive yards, respectively. In fact, eight of the Tigers' ten seasons with the highest offensive output have come since 2000 under head coaches Tommy Tuberville, Gene Chizik, and Gus Malzahn.

These lists are updated through game 13 of the 2022 season.

Passing

Passing yards

Passing touchdowns

Rushing

Rushing yards

Rushing touchdowns

Receiving

Receptions

Receiving yards

Receiving touchdowns

Total offense
Total offense is the sum of passing and rushing statistics. It does not include receiving or returns.

Total offense yards

Touchdowns responsible for
"Touchdowns responsible for" is the NCAA's official term for combined passing and rushing touchdowns.

Defense

Interceptions

Tackles

Sacks

Kicking

Field goals made

Field goal percentage

References

Lists of college football statistical leaders by team
Statistical leaders